Claude Littner (born 4 May 1949) is an American-born British business executive and the former chairman of Viglen, Powerleague, ASCO and Azzuri Communications. He is also the Deputy Chairman of Blacks Leisure and former chief executive of Tottenham Hotspur.  He is also known from his appearances on the British version of The Apprentice, interviewing for his former boss Alan Sugar. Littner became one of Sugar's aides from the 2015 series onwards.

Early life 
Littner was born in New York City, to an American mother and an Austrian-Jewish father, who had fled the Nazis in the 1930s. His father worked as a chemical engineer. The family migrated to the United Kingdom soon after Littner's birth. Littner holds British citizenship, and is fluent in French. He is a practising Jew.

Career 
After working in accountancy, Littner developed a career as a turnaround specialist. It was in this role that he met Alan Sugar, and agreed to chair a number of Sugar's companies. In the early 1990s, Littner was chairman and chief executive of Amstrad International, Amstrad Spain and Dancall Telecom.

Claude Littner served as: non-executive chairman of Azzurri Communications; deputy chairman of Blacks Leisure Group from August 2008 to July 2009; executive chairman of the international oilfield support services business ASCO from 2004 to 2007; non-executive director of Norton Way Motors Ltd and Myeloma UK.

A non-executive director of Amstrad since June 2007, in 2009 Sugar resigned a majority of his UK company directorships, handing over his former management duties to Littner, including the chairman's post at Viglen.

Football 
When Sugar was majority owner and chairman of Tottenham Hotspur, Littner was its Chief Executive from 1993 to 1998. He once almost turned down a request from The Princess Royal for tickets to a game. He resigned his directorship in 2001. Littner bought into Powerleague, a five-a-side football centre operator in 2001. After leading a management buyout from 3i Group in 2003, it floated on AIM in 2006. The company was taken over in 2009 by Patron Capital. and he netted some £50m.

The Apprentice 
Littner came to wider UK public recognition through his direct and confrontational style of job interviewing on The Apprentice. He is the only interviewer to have appeared in this role in every series of the programme.

On 27 April 2015, it was announced that Littner had replaced Nick Hewer as Alan Sugar's aide on the show. He started when the 2015 series began on 14 October 2015, and he continues to interview the candidates. 

He took a hiatus from the programme for its sixteenth series due to injuries sustained from a cycling accident in 2021, with series one winner Tim Campbell taking over for the sixteenth series. Littner returned to the show for the first episode of the seventeenth series, but was not well enough to continue. His place has been taken by Tim Campbell for the following 10 episodes.

Honours 
In October 2014, the University of West London's Business School was renamed the Claude Littner Business School in appreciation of his contributions to the university. It was opened and unveiled by long-time associate and colleague, Alan Sugar. In April 2015 the University of West London appointed him a visiting Professor.

Personal life 
Since 1976 Littner has been married to Thelma. They have two sons Anthony and Alex and five grandchildren.

In 1997, at the age of 48, Littner was diagnosed with Non-Hodgkin lymphoma and was given six months to live.

Littner renounced American citizenship in 2018.

Littner endorsed the Conservative Party during the 2019 United Kingdom general election.

References

External links 
 Bio at Business Week
 
Claude Littner at Biogs.com

1949 births
Living people
British businesspeople
Tottenham Hotspur F.C. directors and chairmen
The Apprentice (British TV series)
Businesspeople from New York City
American emigrants to the United Kingdom
Naturalised citizens of the United Kingdom
People educated at Lycée Français Charles de Gaulle
British people of Austrian-Jewish descent
British Jews
Former United States citizens